Great Interviews of the Twentieth Century is a comedy studio album by New Zealand satirist John Clarke and Australian Bryan Dawe. The album was released in November 1990 and peaked at number 49 on The Australian ARIA Charts.

At the ARIA Music Awards of 1991 the album won the ARIA Award for Best Comedy Release.

Track listing
 "Concerning the Economy"	
 "The Idea of a University"	
 "Matters of State"
 "A Great Man"	
 "Australia / U.S. Relations"	
 "The 1989 Ashes Series"	
 "All Stand Please"	
 "The Tradition Continues"	
 "Grace Under Pressure"
 "On Corporate Matters"	
 "Election 1990"	
 "The Liberals Rampant"	
 "A Mystery Explained"
 "Party Unity"	
 "A Triumph of Organisation"
 "A Tragic Loss"	
 "The Consumption Tax Debate"	
 "The Gallipoli Experience"	
 "A Valuable Contribution"	
 "Complete Rooster-Up"	
 "Concerning His Prostate Operation"	
 "The State of Victoria"	
 "The Cambodian Refugee Question"	
 "The Annual Premiers' Conference"	
 "The Killer"

Charts

Release history

References

1990 albums
1990s comedy albums
Bryan Dawe albums
John Clarke (satirist) albums
Warner Records albums
ARIA Award-winning albums